Floscopa scandens is a species of plant in the Commelinaceae family. It is a subscandent herb commonly found near streams and marshy localities in the forests of Western Ghats.

References

Herbs
Flora of the Western Ghats
scandens